The weightlifting competitions at the 2017 Southeast Asian Games in Kuala Lumpur took place at Kuala Lumpur Convention Centre in Kuala Lumpur.

The 2017 Games featured competitions in five events.

Results

Men's 56 kg

Men's 62 kg

Men's 69 kg

Men's 77 kg

Men's 85 kg

References

External links
  

2017 R
Southeast Asian Games